Slaughterhouse is the self-titled debut studio album by hip hop supergroup, Slaughterhouse, consisting of members Crooked I, Joe Budden, Joell Ortiz and Royce da 5'9". The album was released on August 11, 2009 on E1 Music and sold 18,600 copies in its first week.

Background 
In June 2009, E1 Entertainment announced the album. The group came together when Joe Budden was working on a song for his Halfway House album and enlisted the services of Crooked I, Joell Ortiz and Royce da 5'9" for a song entitled "Slaughterhouse". Inspired by the vibe of track and the immediate chemistry of the four rappers, a plan was immediately made to form the supergroup.

Delay 
The album release date was changed from July 7 to August 11. Royce da 5'9" said that the group wanted more time to put into set up and marketing with its label E1 Music. On his interview with AllHipHop on June 12, Royce told: "Even though this [group] is a new way of doing business, we still gotta stick to the old school script when it comes time to market this, to have the proper time to set up a record. We’re not idiots. We understand the concept of labels throwing something against the wall and seeing if it sticks. That’s not what we are in business to do. We’re still in the business of selling records, because we feel we have a great product to present to the public."

The Detroit rapper also stated that the lyrics and the music came together in a way that made them want to generate maximum interest in the self-titled début. Royce continued: "All the push back has to do [with] is the set up. It's great music. My biggest concern with making the project is us picking the best beats possible. Rhyming is there. The best music possible is what I was always concerned with, that’s why a lot of songs came out so good. Joell Ortiz, a Brooklyn-bred artist, said that the process of creating the album was arduous, yet fun. "It was definitely the busiest session I had ever been in my life. To come out with the product that we do have, was ridiculous."

On June 16 via SOHH, the group apologized to their fans and assured them there would be no more delays.

Music 
The album features production from Focus..., the Alchemist, DJ Khalil, Streetrunner, D12's Mr. Porter and more. On June 18, 2009, a street single was released via Joe Budden's Twitter. The track is "Woodstock (Hood Hop)" which is produced by Nottz and features M.O.P. on the hook. The first official single from the album was "The One". The video, shot and directed by Rik Cordero, premiered on July 12 online and on MTV2 Sucka Free & MTV Jams hourly. Royce confirmed that Pharoahe Monch and Novel are set to appear on the album.

The album cover features each member wearing a sports team's logo from another member's hometown. Joell Ortiz's hat is supposed to be a Detroit Tigers hat but is blacked out.

Reception 
After three weeks the album had managed to sell 28,000 copies.

Reviews of the album were favorable. It has a score of 69 out of an overall score of 100 (calculated by only 9 reviews) on Metacritic, stating that the album has "generally favorable reviews."

Allmusic.com gave it a four out of five stars stating that: 

RapReviews gave it a 9 out of 10 stars. they stated: 

XXL gave it XL out of XXL stating: 

HipHopDX gave it a four out of five stars stated : 

About.com has said that:

Track listing

Sample credits
"Sound Off" - Contains a samples of "It's Too Late" by The Stylistics
"Microphone" - Contains a samples of "L'alpagueur" by Michel Colombier
"Not Tonight" - Contains a samples of "I Don't Know Why I Love You" by Thelma Houston
"The One" - Contains a samples of "I'm Still #1" by Boogie Down Productions, "Janie's Got a Gun" by Aerosmith and "Fly Away" by Lenny Kravitz
"Pray (It's a Shame)" - Contains a samples of "It's a Shame" by The Spinners
"Cut You Loose" - Contains a samples of "You're No Good" by The Harvey Averne Dozen

Charts

References

2009 debut albums
Albums produced by the Alchemist (musician)
Albums produced by DJ Khalil
Albums produced by Mr. Porter
Albums produced by Emile Haynie
Albums produced by Focus...
E1 Music albums
Slaughterhouse (group) albums